Miry Hole Branch is a  long 1st order tributary to the Trent River in Jones County, North Carolina.  This is the only stream of this name in the United States.

Course
Miry Hole Branch rises about 2 miles south of Trent Woods, North Carolina and then flows northwest to join the Trent River about 0.5 miles east of River Bend.

Watershed
Miry Hole Branch drains  of area, receives about 54.7 in/year of precipitation, has a wetness index of 528.11, and is about 47% forested.

See also
List of rivers of North Carolina

References

Rivers of North Carolina
Rivers of Jones County, North Carolina